Nikkin Maru (日錦丸) was a 5,587-ton Japanese troop transport during World War II, which sank on 30 June 1944 with great loss of life.

Nikkin Maru was originally built in January 1920 as the West Ivan by the J. F. Duthie & Company in Seattle for the United States Shipping Board Merchant Fleet Corporation. Renamed Golden West in 1928 and Canadian in 1937, she was confiscated by the Japanese in 1941 and renamed Hokusei Maru and finally Nikkin Maru.

Requisitioned by the IJA in early 1943. On 30 June 1944, Nikkin Maru was transporting around 3,200 men of the Japanese 23rd Army from Korea to Japan. The unescorted Nikkin Maru was discovered by the US submarine  and torpedoed and sunk in the Yellow Sea off Mokpo, Korea, at position 35°05´N, 125°00´E. 
Probably all 3,400 soldiers and crew members drowned, making the sinking of Nikkin Maru one of the worst maritime disasters in World War II.

See also 
 List by death toll of ships sunk by submarines
 List of battles and other violent events by death toll

References

1919 ships
Design 1013 ships
Ships built by J. F. Duthie & Company
Merchant ships of the United States
Steamships of the United States
World War II merchant ships of Japan
Steamships of Japan
Ships sunk by American submarines
Maritime incidents in June 1944